Carney is an unincorporated community in Sweet Grass County, Montana, United States. Carney is located along Interstate 90, southwest of Big Timber.

History 

Carney was a stop on the Northern Pacific railway situated on Interstate 90 about eight miles southwest of Big Timber. It once had a depot and an elevator that supported nearby ranches and a small community. The ranches are still present but the town is no longer.

References

Unincorporated communities in Sweet Grass County, Montana
Unincorporated communities in Montana